The Berg River is one of seven smaller rivers that run into Vanderkloof Dam in South Africa. The other rivers are:

Orange River, the longest river in South Africa;
Seekoei River;
Kattegatspruit;
Knapsak River;
Paaikloofspruit; and
Hondeblaf River

Rivers of the Western Cape
Rivers of the Free State (province)